is the name of numerous Buddhist temples in Japan.
Below is an incomplete list:

An'yō-in (Kobe), a branch of Taisan-ji in Kobe, Hyōgo Prefecture
An'yō-in (Kamakura) in Kamakura, Kanagawa Prefecture